The 2015 NASCAR Whelen Southern Modified Tour was the thirteenth season of the NASCAR Whelen Southern Modified Tour (WSMT). It began with the Spring Classic 150 at Caraway Speedway on March 15 and ended with the Charlotte 150 at Charlotte Motor Speedway on October 8. Andy Seuss, who entered the season as the defending Drivers' Champion, won the championship, three points in front of George Brunnhoelzl III. Five races during the season were televised in the United States on NBCSN by a tape-delay.

Drivers

Notes

Schedule

Notes
1 – The Spring Classic 150 was originally scheduled for March 14, but was postponed a day due to forecasted heavy rain.
 The MTP Tire 150 was originally scheduled at Hickory Motor Speedway for October 3, but was postponed a day due to forecasted heavy rain. On October 3, it was announced that the race would not be rescheduled.

Results and standings

Races

Drivers' championship

(key) Bold – Pole position awarded by time. Italics - Pole position set by final practice results or rainout. * – Most laps led.

Notes
1 – Trey Hutchens received championship points, despite the fact that he did not qualify for the race.
2 – Paul Hartwig Jr. received championship points, despite the fact that he did not start the race.
3 – Scored points towards the Whelen Modified Tour.

See also

2015 NASCAR Sprint Cup Series
2015 NASCAR Xfinity Series
2015 NASCAR Camping World Truck Series
2015 NASCAR K&N Pro Series East
2015 NASCAR K&N Pro Series West
2015 NASCAR Whelen Modified Tour
2015 NASCAR Canadian Tire Series
2015 NASCAR Mexico Series
2015 NASCAR Whelen Euro Series

References